Oleksandr Sytnik (born 7 July 1984 in Ukraine) is a professional Ukrainian football striker who recently played for Kapaz in the Azerbaijan Premier League. He spent time with Metalurh Donetsk after a summer transfer season of 2007 from FC Stal Kamianske. In 2009, he played several games for FC Hoverla Uzhhorod and in April 2010 signed with FC Zirka Kropyvnytskyi.

References

External links
Profile on Official Metalurh Donetsk Website
Profile on Football Squads
Profile on EUFO

1984 births
Living people
People from Novomoskovsk
Ukrainian footballers
Ukrainian Premier League players
FC Metalurh Donetsk players
FC Shakhtar Donetsk players
FC Hoverla Uzhhorod players
FC Zirka Kropyvnytskyi players
FC Olimpik Donetsk players
Kapaz PFK players
Ukrainian expatriate footballers
Expatriate footballers in Kazakhstan
Expatriate footballers in Azerbaijan
Association football forwards
Sportspeople from Dnipropetrovsk Oblast